Hodgkin is a surname. Notable people with the surname include:

 Alan Lloyd Hodgkin (1914–1998), British physiologist and biophysicist
 Dorothy Hodgkin (1910–1994), British chemist who received the Nobel Prize in Chemistry in 1964, wife of Thomas Lionel Hodgkin
 Douglas Hodgkin, American political scientist and author
 Eliot Hodgkin (1905–1987), British painter
 Howard Hodgkin (1932–2017), British painter
 John Hodgkin (barrister) (1800–1875), English barrister and Quaker preacher, brother of Thomas Hodgkin (1798–1866)
 Robert Howard Hodgkin (1877–1951), English historian, son of Thomas Hodgkin (1831–1913)
 Thomas Hodgkin (1798–1866), English pathologist, eponym of Hodgkin's disease
 Thomas Hodgkin (historian) (1831–1913), British historian, son of John Hodgkin
 Thomas Lionel Hodgkin (1910–1982), English historian, son of Robert Howard Hodgkin, husband of Dorothy Hodgkin

See also
 Hodgkins (disambiguation)
 Hodgkin lymphoma, also known as Hodgkin's lymphoma and Hodgkin's disease
 Hodgkin family, the Quaker family

English-language surnames
Patronymic surnames
Surnames from given names